V849 Ophiuchi or Nova Ophiuchi 1919 was a nova that erupted in 1919, in the constellation Ophiuchus, and reached a blue band brightness of magnitude 7.2.  Joanna C. S. Mackie discovered the star while she was examining Harvard College Observatory photographic plates. The earliest plate it was visible on was exposed on August 20, 1919, when the star was at magnitude 9.4. It reached magnitude 7.5 on September 13 of that year. In its quiescent state it has a visual magnitude of about 18.8. V849 Ophiuchi is classified as a "slow nova"; it took six months for it to fade by three magnitudes.

All novae are binary stars, and V849 is an eclipsing binary. Its orbital period is 4.146128 hours.

References

External links
https://web.archive.org/web/20050909054008/http://www.tsm.toyama.toyama.jp/curators/aroom/var/nova/1910.htm

Novae
Ophiuchus (constellation)
?
Ophiuchi, V849
167276